Pescetti, Pescetta, Pescetto (also anglicized 'Peschetti' etc.) is an Italian family name and may refer to:

 
 Anthony Pescetti, member of the California State Assembly in 2002-2003
 Federico Giovanni Battista Pescetto (1817-1883), Italian Scottish Rite Freemason and twofold Minister in the Rattazzi II Cabinet
 Giovanni Battista Pescetti, 18th-century Venetian organist and composer
 Jeff Pescetto, US songwriter
 Luis Pescetti (1958-), Argentine author and essayist